The Aircraft Kit Industry Association (AKIA) is an American aviation advocacy association that was formed in July 2012 and formally constituted at AirVenture 2012.

The organization promotes the kit aircraft industry and advocates for allowing flight training in amateur-built aircraft as a means of reducing accidents in that sector of aviation. It also acts as a defender of the majority portion, or 51% rule, in amateur-built aircraft regulations, ensuring that the kit owners do the majority of the construction work.

History
AKIA was formed as a result of pressure on the kit aircraft industry from both the Federal Aviation Administration and the National Transportation Safety Board regarding the poor safety record of amateur-built aircraft. The NTSB actually recommended that the kit industry form an association, something that had already begun, as well as aircraft type transition training for amateur-builts.

The organization was formed through a series of telephone conversations held in the spring of 2012 between kit aircraft manufacturers. They agreed that there were problems with industry stagnation, issues between the manufacturers, the FAA and the Experimental Aircraft Association and saw the need to pool their resources to address these problems. In particular, they needed a single voice to address potential regulatory changes that might be brought forward to address safety.

Speaking for the organization at AirVenture 2012, President & Founder Dick VanGrunsven stated on the subject of the kit aircraft accident record: "it's time we make our presence known and become proactive in addressing safety issues...more attention should be paid to the first pre-flight." He also singled out transition training for pilots buying kit aircraft and flight testing accidents. He concluded, "collectively, we have the knowledge and experience to make a difference in the culture."

In an interview in December 2012 VanGrunsven said "We see AKIA as being the key source of information and counsel for our industry and for the broader field of E-AB aircraft construction and operation. We have already established very positive contacts with EAA, FAA, NTSB, AOPA, SETP, GAMA and LAMA. We have common interests with all non-government groups, and with government agencies as well, because of our shared interests in aviation safety. We do not see ourselves as a threat to any because success within our industry only increases the aviation activity on which member organizations such as EAA and AOPA thrive."

Officers and advisors
The association's first officers include:
President John Monnett 
Vice President Dick VanGrunsven
Secretary Dave Gustafson

The advisory board consists of:
Frank Christensen
Robert Goyer
Dale Klapmeier
Tom Poberezny

Membership
The initial members were:
Aircraft Spruce & Specialty Co
Kitfox Aircraft
Lancair
Sonex Aircraft
Van's Aircraft
Wicks Aircraft Supply
Zenith Aircraft Company

References

External links

Aviation organizations based in the United States
Lobbying organizations in the United States
Marion County, Oregon
Organizations based in Oregon
2012 establishments in Oregon
Organizations established in 2012